David Michael Israel is an Emmy and Golden Globe award-winning television producer and writer as well as a former sportscaster for the New York Mets. ("Before moving to Los Angeles from New York, Israel was a writer, producer and editor for Major League Baseball, working on such projects as This Week in Baseball, the 1986 New York Mets Highlight Film, and several World Series Highlight Films."). He has worked on The Tracy Morgan Show, 3rd Rock from the Sun, Grounded for Life and the Nickelodeon  sitcom How to Rock and Dynasty (2017 TV series).  He was a writer and co-executive producer on the NBC show About a Boy.

In 2005, Israel and his partner Jim O'Doherty were signed to a two-year development deal with NBCUniversal.

In 2016, Israel founded David Israel Productions, a TV shingle focused on scripted reality programming. Their LA offices are located on the CBS Radford lot in Studio City.

Education
He is a 1980 graduate of George W. Hewlett High School in Hewlett, New York and a 1984 graduate of Syracuse University.

Career
MARVIN MARVIN	NICKELODEON	CONSULTANT/CONSULTING PRODUCER		COMPLETED	2012-2013

References

External links

 David Israel, TV.com
 Thesps do pilot 'Service'

American male screenwriters
American male television actors
Television producers from New York (state)
George W. Hewlett High School alumni
Living people
People from Hewlett, New York
Syracuse University alumni
Place of birth missing (living people)
Year of birth missing (living people)
American male television writers
American television writers
Screenwriters from New York (state)
Emmy Award winners
Golden Globe Award winners